Turag Thana is a thana, an administrative unit, in Dhaka City, Bangladesh. Turag Thana police station is the designated police station of the thana.

References

Thanas of Uttara
Thanas of Dhaka
Areas under Dhaka-18 constituency